Frank Joseph Scott Wise AO (30 May 1897 – 29 June 1986) was a Labor Party politician who was the 16th Premier of Western Australia. He took office on 31 July 1945 in the closing stages of the Second World War, following the resignation of his predecessor due to ill health. He lost the following election two years later to the Liberal Party after Labor had held office for fourteen years previously.

Wise was a farmer for several years in Queensland before working in the Department of Agriculture in that state.  He later moved to Western Australia as a technical adviser in the Western Australian Department of Agriculture and in 1928 was commissioned to report and advise on tropical agriculture in the Northern Territory and the North West of Western Australia.

In the 1933 state election which saw future Premiers Albert Hawke and John Tonkin also win seats, Wise successfully contested the seat of Gascoyne (now merged into Murchison-Eyre) in the state's lower house for the Labor Party. In 1936 he moved to the front bench as Minister for Agriculture and the North-West.

For reasons of ill health, John Willcock resigned his premiership on 31 July 1945 and Wise was elected into the position. Wise held the position for only two years until the 1947 election when his party lost to the Liberals headed by Sir Ross McLarty.

He was Leader of the Opposition for the next four years before taking up the position of Administrator of the Northern Territory and President of the Northern Territory Legislative Council (now replaced with the unicameral Northern Territory Legislative Assembly).

In 1942, botanist Charles Gardner named the Australian shrub Acacia wiseana in his honour.

In the 1979 Australia Day honours list, he was appointed an Officer of the Order of Australia for his services to politics.

References

1897 births
1986 deaths
Administrators of the Northern Territory
Australian Labor Party members of the Parliament of Western Australia
Deputy Premiers of Western Australia
Leaders of the Opposition in Western Australia
Members of the Western Australian Legislative Assembly
Members of the Western Australian Legislative Council
Members of the Northern Territory Legislative Council
Officers of the Order of Australia
People from Ipswich, Queensland
Premiers of Western Australia
Treasurers of Western Australia
20th-century Australian politicians